The 26th annual Venice International Film Festival was held from 24 August to 6 September 1965.

Jury
 Carlo Bo (Italy) (head of jury)
 Lewis Jacobs (USA)  
 Nikolai Lebedev (Soviet Union)
 Jay Leyda (USA)
 Max Lippmann (West Germany)
 Edgar Morin (France)
 Rune Waldekranz (Sweden)

Films in competition

Awards
Golden Lion:
Sandra (Luchino Visconti)
Special Jury Prize:
I Am Twenty (Marlen Khutsiyev)
Simon of the Desert (Luis Buñuel)
Modiga mindre män (Leif Krantz)
Volpi Cup:
 Best Actor - Toshirô Mifune - (Red Beard)
 Best Actress - Annie Girardot  - (Three Rooms in Manhattan)
Best First Work
Vernost (Pyotr Todorovsky)
FIPRESCI Prize
Simon of the Desert (Luis Buñuel)
Gertrud (Carl Theodor Dreyer)
OCIC Award
Red Beard (Akira Kurosawa)
UNICRIT Award
Twenty Hours (Zoltán Fábri)
Lion of San Marco
Utek do vetru (Václav Táborsky)
Tjorven, Båtsman och Moses (Olle Hellbom)
The Snowy Day (Mal Wittman)
Enter Hamlet (School of Visual Art California)
Best Film about Adolescence - The Searching Eye (Saul Bass)
Best Documentary - Le isole incantante (Aleksandr Zguridi)
Best Documentary - Television - Philippe Pétain: Processo a Vichy (Liliana Cavani)
Best Children's Film - Television - Charley (Jimmy Murakami & Alan Ball)
Lion of San Marco - Grand Prize
Jack Frost (Aleksandr Rou)
Silver Medal
Daylight Robbery (Darryl Read)
San Michele Award
The Whacky Mixed-Up Carabiniers (Felix G. Palmer)

References

External links
 
 Venice Film Festival 1965 Awards on IMDb

Venice International Film Festival
Venice International Film Festival
Venice Film Festival
Film
Venice International Film Festival
Venice International Film Festival